ARA Parker (M-11) was a  of the Argentine Navy.

History
ARA Parker was launched on May 2, 1937 in the Lujan River. She was initially classed as an Auxiliary ship assigned to Defence Command, participating in exercises under the Offshore Sea Fleet in South Atlantic waters under its first Commander, Lieutenant Aníbal Olivieri. In 1940, it was assigned to the Instruction Squadron of the Military Naval School, along with ARA Sarmiento, Puevrredon and Py. She forward based to Río Santiago, Puerto Belgrano Naval Base, Golfo Nuevo, Mar del Plata and Punta del Este, before returning to Río Santiago. In April 1940, she joined the 1st Division of Trackers and participated in the training of the Sea Fleet, in the South Atlantic.

ARA Parker did not participate in the Revolución Libertadora as it was decommissioned the previous year.

References

1937 ships
Bouchard-class minesweepers
Ships built in Argentina